Cornelis Gerrit "Kees" van der Staaij (born 12 September 1968) is a Dutch politician serving as a member of the House of Representatives since 1998 and Leader of the Reformed Political Party (Staatkundig Gereformeerde Partij, SGP) since 2010. As a parliamentarian, he focuses on matters of judiciary, home affairs, Kingdom relations, foreign policy, the European Union, development aid, the defense, public health, welfare, sports, immigration and political asylum. Since 2017 Van der Staaij has been the longest running current member of the House of Representatives.

Early life
Van der Staaij was born in Vlaardingen, a city in the province of South Holland. His father was a civil servant in the municipality Maartensdijk.

He went to two Reformed primary schools in Vlaardingen (1974–1979) and Geldermalsen (1979–1980) and to a Reformed secondary school in Amersfoort (1980–1986). He studied law at Leiden University, specialising in constitutional and administrative law.

Politics
Van der Staaij was attracted to politics and became a member of the Reformed Political Party in 1986.

After several jobs at the Council of State, he was elected to the House of Representatives in 1998. In 2010 he became party leader as well as parliamentary leader in both cases succeeding Bas van der Vlies. He led his party as lijsttrekker in the 2010, 2012 and 2017 general elections.

Van der Staaij is considered one of the most conservative and right-wing political leaders in the Netherlands. He signed the anti-LGBTQI Nashville Statement and supported anti-abortion organisations, making sure such organisations were granted more subsidies. Before the 2012 Dutch general election, when asked whether he agreed with Todd Akin's comments on "legitimate rape" and pregnancy, he said "it is a fact" that women "seldom" become pregnant after being raped. He and his party focus on the importance of faith and community in society and frequently advocate for theocracy.

Van der Staaij again served as lijsttrekker or main candidate for the SGP in the 2021 general election. The SGP won 3 out of the 150 seats in the House of Representatives.

Electoral history

References
 Parlement.com biography

External links

 House of Representatives biography

|-

1968 births
Living people
20th-century Dutch politicians
21st-century Dutch politicians
Dutch Calvinist and Reformed Christians
Dutch civil servants
Dutch jurists
Leaders of the Reformed Political Party
Leiden University alumni
Male critics of feminism
Members of the House of Representatives (Netherlands)
People from Vlaardingen
Reformed Political Party politicians